Knidus or Cnidus was an ancient Greek city on the Elaea promontory in northeastern Cyprus. It currently lies in the de facto Turkish Republic of Northern Cyprus

References
Richard Talbert, Barrington Atlas of the Greek and Roman World,, p. 72

Cities in ancient Cyprus
Former populated places in Cyprus